US Post Office—North Tonawanda is a historic post office building located at North Tonawanda in Niagara County, New York. It was designed and built in 1912, and is one of a number of post offices in New York State designed by the Office of the Supervising Architect of the Treasury Department, Oscar Wenderoth.  The two story building is in the Classical Revival style and features a colossal central portico with two pairs of coupled columns resting on granite pedestals and an elegant domed cupola.

It was listed on the National Register of Historic Places in 1989.

References

External links
US Post Office-North Tonawanda - U.S. National Register of Historic Places on Waymarking.com

North Tonawanda
Government buildings completed in 1914
Neoclassical architecture in New York (state)
Buildings and structures in Niagara County, New York
North Tonawanda, New York
National Register of Historic Places in Niagara County, New York
1914 establishments in New York (state)